is a passenger railway station located in the town of Ōtoyo, Nagaoka District, Kōchi Prefecture, Japan. It is operated by JR Shikoku and has the station number "D34".

Lines

Layout
The station, which is unstaffed, consists of a side platform serving a single track. There is a shelter on the platform and another small building behind the platform which serves as a waiting room.

Adjacent stations

History
At this time the station was operated by Japanese Government Railways, later becoming Japanese National Railways (JNR). With the privatization of JNR on 1 April 1987, control of the station passed to JR Shikoku.

Surrounding area
Otoyo Municipal Tentsubo Elementary School (currently closed)

See also
 List of Railway Stations in Japan

References

External links

H|JR Shikoku timetable 

Railway stations in Kōchi Prefecture
Railway stations in Japan opened in 1930
Ōtoyo, Kōchi